"Won't Get Fooled Again" is a 1971 song by The Who.

Won't Get Fooled Again may also refer to:
 Won't Get Fooled Again (EP), a 1988 EP by The Who that includes the song
 "Won't Get Fooled Again" (Criminal Minds episode)
 "Won't Get Fooled Again" (Farscape episode)
 "Won't Get Fooled Again" (Instant Star episode)

See also 
 "Won't Get Fueled Again", an episode of CSI: Miami
 Don't Get Fooled Again, a chapter of the manga One Piece